The Forbidden Legend Sex & Chopsticks. is a 2008 Hong Kong sex film directed by Qian Wenqi and produced by Wong Jing, starring Oscar Lam wai-kin, Norman Chui, and Hayakawa Serina, based on the 1610 novel The Golden Lotus by Lanling Xiaoxiao Sheng.  The film premiered in Hong Kong on 19 September 2008.

Cast
 Oscar Lam wai-kin as Ximen Qing.
 Norman Chui as Ximen Qing's father.
 Hayakawa Serina as Pan Jinlian.
 Wakana Hikaru as Ming Yue.
 Yui Morikawa as Ximen Qing's mother.
 Kaera Uehara as Zi Yan.
 Liang Minyi as Chun Mei.

Release
The film was first released on 19 September 2008 in Hong Kong.

The film received mixed reviews.

Sequel
The film's sequel, The Forbidden Legend Sex & Chopsticks 2, was released in Hong Kong on 1 April 2009.

References

External links

Hong Kong erotic films
Films based on Jin Ping Mei
Films set in Hebei
2000s Hong Kong films